

About
Patrick Gabriel Dooley (born 17 May 1997) is an Australian cricketer. On 6 January 2022, Dooley was added to the Brisbane Heat squad for the 2021-22 Big Bash League season after 12 players were ruled out with COVID-19. Dooley can bowl left-arm unorthodox spin as well as a left-arm orthodox spin. His unique bowling action received praise from Michael Vaughan and Mike Hussey on his BBL debut.

Domestic & Youth Career
Early on in his career Dooley played for the Under-19 Queensland cricket team.

Dooley made his Twenty20 debut as a replacement for players ruled out with COVID-19 for the Brisbane Heat against the Hobart Hurricanes on 9 January 2022 at The Gabba, conceding 25 runs from his 4 overs, having Ben McDermott dropped off his bowling. On 26 February 2023, he made his List A debut for the Queensland against the New South Wales in the 2022–23 Marsh One-Day Cup.

Dooley signed for the Hobart Hurricanes for the 2022–23 Big Bash League season taking 17 wickets in his 10 matches with a best of 4/16 against the Perth Scorchers, being named Player of the Match. Dooley has proven to be an asset for the Hobart Hurricanes thus far.

References

1997 births
Living people
Brisbane Heat cricketers
Australian cricketers
Hobart Hurricanes cricketers